Hareesh Peradi is an Indian actor who predominantly acts in Malayalam and Tamil films.

Career 
Hareesh Peradi is also a theatre artist in Kerala, having made a mark in stage and also in TV and cinema. Even though he has acted in 36 films so far, it was Malayalam film, Left Right Left (2013), that gave him a break. In the film, he played the lead role, that of a politician with shades of grey. Vikram Vedha (2017) gave him his big break in Tamil cinema.

He was seen in the Tamil Movie, Sulthan, directed by Bakkiyaraj Kannan and co-starring Karthi, Rashmika Mandanna, Yogi Babu, Lal, Ponnambalam. He was praised for the portrayal of Mangattachan in the movie Marakkar: Lion of the Arabian Sea released in 2021. Sajin Srijith of The New Indian Express wrote that, "Hareesh Peradi, the veteran character artiste proves once again that he can completely disappear into a role, be it negative or positive." Mammotty appreciated him for the same during AMMA's General Body Meeting.

Filmography

Malayalam

Tamil

Telugu

Television

Web series

As Dubbing artist

References

External links
 

Living people
Indian male film actors
Indian male television actors
Indian male stage actors
Male actors from Kozhikode
21st-century Indian male actors
Male actors in Tamil cinema
Male actors in Malayalam cinema
Year of birth missing (living people)